Eriogonum maculatum is a species of wild buckwheat known by the common name spotted buckwheat. It is native to western North America from Washington to Baja California to Utah, where it can be found in a number of habitats, often in abundance.

Description
This is an erect annual herb reaching heights of anywhere from 5 to 40 centimeters. Most of the woolly leaves are located at the base of the plant, but there may be a few along the stem.

The branching inflorescence holds many clusters of bright red and white striped flowers. Each flower is a few millimeters wide with distinctly cup-shaped tepals which are covered in minute spiky glands. The bright striping on the small tepals make the flower cluster look spotted from afar, hence its common name. It grows in sand, gravel or clay slopes and flats, grassland, and shrub-steppe.

References

External links
Jepson Manual Treatment - Eriogonum maculatum
Eriogonum maculatum - Photo gallery

maculatum
Flora of the Northwestern United States
Flora of the Southwestern United States
Flora of the Sierra Nevada (United States)
Flora of the Sonoran Deserts
Flora of the California desert regions
Flora of the Great Basin
Flora of California
Natural history of the Santa Monica Mountains
Flora without expected TNC conservation status